Hugh McKenzie may refer to:

 Hugh McKenzie (VC) (1885–1917), Canadian recipient of the Victoria Cross,
 Hugh McKenzie (Australian politician) (1853–1942), member of the Victorian Legislative Assembly
 Hugh McKenzie (Manitoba politician) (1870–1957), member of the Legislative Assembly of Manitoba
 Hugh McKenzie (Ontario politician) (1840–1893), Ontario farmer and political figure